Julian is a surname. Notable people with that surname include

Sports
Alan Julian (born 1983), Northern Ireland footballer
Bill Julian (1867 – 1957), English football player and coach
Brendon Julian (born 1970), Australian cricketer
Cyril Julian (born 1974), French basketball player.
Doggie Julian (1901 – 1967), American football, basketball, and baseball player and coach
Elton Julian (born 1974), American professional racing driver and racing team owner
Fred Julian (1938 – 2013), American football player and coach
Jeff Julian (golfer) (1961 – 2004), American golfer
Pete Julian (born 1971), American athlete

Arts
Alexander Julian (born 1948), American clothing designer
Arthur Julian (1923 – 1995), American actor, producer and television writer
Charles-André Julien, French historian
Don Julian (musician) (1937 – 1998), American singer, guitarist and songwriter
Janet Julian (born 1959), American actress
Joanne Julian, Armenian/ American artist 
Madhav Julian (1894 – 1939), Marathi poet
Paul Julian (artist) (1914 – 1995), American background animator, sound effects artist, and voice actor
Peter Julian (artist) (born 1952), American artist
Rodolphe Julian (1839 - 1907), French painter, etcher and professor
Rupert Julian (1879 – 1943), New Zealand cinema actor, director, writer and producer
Shirley Julian (1914 – 1995), American artist and pacificist
Renz Julian, American rapper

Politics
Ana Pastor Julián (born 1957), Spanish doctor and politician
Anthony Julian (1902 – 1984), American judge
George Washington Julian (1817-1899), US Representative and Abolitionist from Indiana
Henry S. Julian (1862–1939), American lawyer and politician
Larry Julian (born 1949), American politician
Maricela Contreras Julián (born 1961), Mexican politician
Patti Julian, American lawyer and politician
Peter Julian (born 1962), Canadian politician
Robert F. Julian, American lawyer and former sports executive
William Alexander Julian (1870 – 1949), American politician

Other
Anna Johnson Julian (1903 – 1994), African-American civic activist
Chris Julian (designer), designer, philanthropist and retail entrepreneur
George Julian (disambiguation)
Hubert Julian (1897 – 1983), Trinidad aviation
John Julian (priest) (1839 – 1913), English clergyman
Joseph R. Julian (1918 – 1945), American military officer
Ivor Julian (1895 – 1971), English public administrator
Paul Julian (meteorologist) (born 1929), American meteorologist
Percy Lavon Julian (1899 – 1975), American research chemist

See also

Julian (disambiguation)

Lists of people by surname